Brennan Inlet is an ice-filled inlet in the southeast part of the Getz Ice Shelf, bounded to the west by Scott Peninsula and Nunn Island and to the east by Spaulding Peninsula, on the Bakutis Coast, Marie Byrd Land. It was named by the Advisory Committee on Antarctic Names after Lieutenant Commander Lawrence A. Brennan, U.S. Navy Reserve, who helped plan and execute the recovery of three damaged LC-130 aircraft from Dome Charlie in East Antarctica, successfully accomplished in the 1975–76 and 1976–77 seasons.

References
 

Inlets of Antarctica
Bodies of water of Marie Byrd Land